Tipulidomima is a genus of parasitic flies in the family Tachinidae. There is one described species in Tipulidomima, T. tessmanni.

References

Tachinidae
Monotypic Brachycera genera
Taxa named by Charles Henry Tyler Townsend
Diptera of Africa